Adléta is an Old Czech form of the German name Adelaide. In the Czech calendar, it is celebrated on 2 September.

Famous bearers 
Adléta of Meissen, the first Queen consort of Přemysl I of Bohemia
Adléta von Braunschweig-Grubenhagen, daughter of Jindřich I. von Braunschweig and Anežka Durynská

External links 
Adléta Švábová
Libri.cz

Czech feminine given names